Satnampanth, also called Satnami Samaj, Satnami movement, or Sadhanpanth, This sect is thought to be an offshoot of the Ravidassia sect (sampradaya) founded by Bir Bhan (1543-1620 AD), of Narnaul district. His guru was Udhodas, the pupil of Saint Ravidas, a Chamar. A Haryana Review periodical issue regarding the Satnamis of the age of Bir Bhan, "A Satnami had three attributes: he put on the garb of a devotee , earned money through fair means and did not bear any type of injustice or atrocity."

Jagjivan Das is the second most important Satnami. Due to his spiritual fame, he was met by Emperor Akbar. Swami Dayal lists Jagjivan Sahab as his predecessor and writes: 

If in your mind you do not believe what I say, then consult the sayings of Kabir and Guru Nanak. Tulsi's persuasion is just the same, and so is that of Paltu and Jagjivan. These saints I take as my authority, and I witness to what they teach.

The sect has an official foundation date, which is April 21, 1657.

This sect is named after its Lord, Satnam.

Historically, chroniclers have also wrote of them as mundiah (because followers often shaved their heads) and bairagi.

Satnami Revolt 1672
The Satnami revolt occurred in the reign of the Moghul Emperor Aurungzeb. Many Hindus resented Aurungzeb’s strict Islamic policies-which included reviving the hated Islamic Jiziya tax (poll tax on non-Muslim subjects), banning music and art, and destroying Hindu temples. The revolt began in 1672 when a Moghul soldier killed a Satnami. Other Satnamis took revenge on the Moghul soldier, and in turn the Moghul soldiers went about repressing the Satnamis. The result was that about 5,000 Satnamis were up in arms. They routed the Moghul troops situated in the town, drove away the Moghul administrators and set up their own administration in its place. The uprising gained the enthusiasm of Hindus in Agra and Ajmer also. Though totally lacking in weaponry and money, the Satnamis inflicted several defeats on the Moghul forces. The contemporary Moghul chronicler, Saqi Mustaid Khan, expressed amazement as to what came over this “destitute gang of goldsmiths, carpenters, sweepers and tanners and other… artisan castes that their conceited brains became so overclouded? Rebellious pride having found a place in their brains, their heads became too heavy for their shoulders.” This also shows the thinking of Muslim intelligentsia who regard them as untouchables. Amusingly, in contrast, Hindus have greatly respected the Satnamis throughout for their beliefs like prohibition of intoxicants and meat. The resentment of the Satnamis against the Moghul persecution meant that they even enacted revenge by destroying mosques in the area. It was only with great difficulty that any Muslim soldiers could be brought to face the Satnamis, such was the wrath of the Satnamis at the time. It was only when Aurungzeb himself took personal command and sent 10,000 troops with artillery that the Satnamis fell. They put up a brave defense. According to Saqi Mustaid Khan they believed that they were re-enacting scenes from the Mahabharata war. 2,000 Satnamis were slain on the battlefield and many more were slain in pursuit. What followed was an attempt to slay every remaining member of the Satnamis, and destroy all their homes. The remnants of the Satnamis fled in all directions and for a long time were totally disorganized and leaderless.

Revival and Promulgation
The sect was revived decades around 1714, when a community calling itself Satnami Sadh sprung up in Panchal Nagar (Farrukhabad), U.P. [Interestingly, the fourth, fifth and ninth Sikh gurus addressed "Saints" of Sikh history as Sadh. For example, in the stanza of the Var of Sorath, the sadh, sant, bhagat, Gurmukh, and Gursikh are mentioned together.]

The second revival was again decades later by Jagjivan Das, a Chandel Thakur, whose guru was Maharaja Vishveshwara Puri. His own chief disciples were Dulanadasa, Gosaindasa, Devidasa and Khemadasa.

The third revival was by Ghasidas, a Chamar, in the 1820s at present-day Chhattisgarh picked up and founded his own offshoot-Satnami sect. His teachings were saved in the Nirvan Gyan scripture, which he wrote.

Etymology and Usage
The term Satnam, was first used by Vaishnava Saint Ramanuja in his Satanaama Stotra. It was later used by Vaishnava Saint Kabir. 

Kabir said:
Serve the sadhus, repeat Sat Nam and remain in the company of the guru.

Another verse of his was:
This is the Satguru's message: Sat Nam is the real essence of His being , it is the bearer of the tidings of your liberation.

Satnam is used as a name for males and females, usually Sikhs, though. Satyanam is used as a title, like for companies, such as Satyanam Info Solution and Satyanam Satya Guru B.Ed College.

Satnam is chanted in yoga.

Worship
In venerating Satnam, Satnamis chant Satnam three times.

Apart from Satnam, worship is also offered to Ramachandra and Hanuman [whom Satnamis refer to as Mahabir.] In fact, incense is burnt to Hanuman.

Satnamis celebrate Dussehra and many also take a pilgrimage to Bhandar for the festivity.

Commandments
The practices of Satnamis differ in terms of observed rules, because some forbearances given by Bir Bhan were followed by Ghasidas and are still followed by Ghasidas' followers, such as wearing or tilaks and rosaries, and practicing meditation. Worshiping gods in addition to Satnam is also practiced by followers of Ghasidas.

From Sant Bir Bhan
Bir Bhan issued edicts in his Adi Updesh.
There is one Sat Purush - Satnam.
Humility and modesty, elimination of ego and pride.
No backbiting. Use your tongue only to recite His Name. Do not let your eyes fall on improper objects, nor on women, dances, shows and worldly me.
Only hear the praise of God. Listen to no evil discourse, no tales, no gossip, no calumny, not even music, except hymns.
Non-covetousness. Trust in God who is the giver of everything you.
Never mention your caste when asked who you are. Only declare yourself as a Sadh.
Wear white garments, no pigments, nor colyrium, or henna (mehndi), or any tilak, nor chaplets, or rosaries or jewels.
Take no intoxicants and smell no perfumes. Never bow your head to any idol or man.
Complete nonviolence in thought, word, and deed. No damnatory evidence be given.
Marry only one. No man should touch a woman's leavings, but a woman may of a man's.
Live as a householder, not as mendicant. No acceptance of alms or gifts. The company of sadhus is the only pilgrimage.
No superstition as to a day, or lunation or month or the cry of an animal or appearance of a bird or any other sign or mark be observed.

From Sant Ghasidas
Worship Satnam, as formless without any shrines.
Abstain from meat and alcohol.
Use brass utensils for cooking and eating.
Abstain from smoking/chewing tobacco.
Abstain working from leather and carcasses.
Abstain using cows for plowing.
Wear kanthi (necklace) of beads made from tulasi.

History
Ghasidas, according to M. A. Sherring, may have been influenced by the teachings of Ravidas, a disciple of Ramananda. Others believe he was inspired by Kabir, through the Kabirpanthis in Chhattisgarh.

Symbolism
The Satnamis have a sect mark of a straight line down the forehead drawn with ashes from an offering to Hanuman.

References

Notes

Sources

External links
Satnam Sahitya Sewa Sansthan
Jagatguru Satnam Panth
Assam Satnami Samaj
Sat Nam Fest

Articles
"Jagjivan Das – Exponent Of The Satnami Sect" By Abhilash Rajendran (Monday, August 09, 2021)
"Satnami Rebellion"
Satnami sect at the Encyclopædia Britannica
Devotional Practices of the Satnamis on Sahapedia

Hindu denominations
Religion in Chhattisgarh
Satnami
Dalit communities
Bhakti movement
Scheduled Castes of Chhattisgarh